Hemisilurus is a genus of sheatfishes native to Southeast Asia.

Species
There are currently three recognized species in this genus:
 Hemisilurus heterorhynchus (Bleeker, 1854)
 Hemisilurus mekongensis Bornbusch & Lundberg, 1989
 Hemisilurus moolenburghi Weber & de Beaufort, 1913

Species in this genus have no dorsal fin and only two barbels.
Hemisilurus mekongensis, known as Pa nang daeng in the Laotian language, is endemic to the Mekong basin.

References

External links

Hemisilurus heterorhynchus (Bleeker, 1854)
Hemisilurus moolenburghi	(Weber & de Beaufort, 1913)
A New Species of Hemisilurus (Siluriformes, Siluridae) from the Mekong River
Mekong Fisheries of Thailand

Siluridae
Fish of Southeast Asia
Taxa named by Pieter Bleeker
Catfish genera
Freshwater fish genera